Richard Bebb (12 January 1927 – 12 April 2006) was an English actor of stage, screen and radio.

Born Richard Bebb Williams in London, he changed his name to his mother's surname, Bebb, when he took up acting as there was already a British actor called Richard Williams. Bebb's father Herbert Edward Williams was a physician whose practice was run from part of St Mary's Lodge, the family's impressive home in Stoke Newington.

In 1952, he married actress Gwen Watford (1927–1994), who predeceased him.

Bebb was a prolific performer in theatre, television and radio, probably most famously as "Second Voice" in the original 1954 BBC Radio broadcast of Dylan Thomas's Under Milk Wood, opposite Richard Burton's "First Voice". 

On television, he appeared in early televised Shakespeare to Z Cars, Dixon of Dock Green, Softly, Softly (TV series), and a long running role in the soap-opera serial Compact. Throughout the 1990s he was frequently in the Poirot series.

He also appeared in several films, such as Pope Joan (1972) and King Ralph (1991).

Music interest and record collection

Bebb was an avid collector of 78 rpm gramophone records. He was a committee member of the British Institute of Recorded Sound, a forerunner to the British Library Sound Archive, and oversaw the launch of Historic Masters, a vinyl record label dedicated to issuing rare 78 rpm recordings of historic opera singers. His personal collection included recordings of singers and opera performances in England, as well as the Henry Irving cylinder recordings which he rediscovered. He did not favour discs based on established values and reputation, but judged singers on their musical merit. His favourite opera was Adriana Lecouvreur by Francesco Cilea. Among singers and performances he had high regard for Dino Borgioli's Do not go, my love, Frida Leider's version of Eboli's aria in Don Carlos, and Magda Olivero's Sola, perduta, abbandonata.

Filmography

See also
 Paul Getty, music collector
 Michael Scott, music critic

References

External links

Obituary, thetimes.co.uk, 20 April 2006.

1927 births
2006 deaths
English male film actors
English male stage actors
English male television actors
English male radio actors
People educated at Highgate School
Alumni of Trinity College, Cambridge
Male actors from London
Place of death missing